Tremor is a 1961 South African film directed by Denis Scully and co produced by Michael Deeley.

External links
Tremor at BFI

South African drama films
1961 films